The Staple Swingers is a soul album by the Staple Singers, released on June 15, 1971.

It was the first Staple Singers album to be produced by Al Bell and recorded in Muscle Shoals. Pervis Staples was replaced by his sister Yvonne Staples prior to the recording of the album. Released in 1971, it charted at number nine on the Billboard Top Soul Albums charts.

Track listing

Personnel
Cleotha Staples, Mavis Staples, Yvonne Staples - lead and backing vocals
 Roebuck "Pops" Staples - vocals, guitar
 Terry Manning – melodica,  guitar, harmonica, vibraphone 
The Memphis Symphony Orchestra - strings, horns
Muscle Shoals Rhythm Section
Dale Warren - arrangements
the Bar-Kays - horn arrangements
Technical
Jimmy Evans, Larry Hamby, Terry Manning - engineer
Joel Brodsky - photography

Charts

Singles

References

External links
 The Staple Singers-The Staple Swingers at Discogs

1971 albums
The Staple Singers albums
Albums produced by Al Bell
Stax Records albums
Albums with cover art by Joel Brodsky
Albums recorded at Muscle Shoals Sound Studio